{{Infobox television station
| logo = 

| callsign = KTTC
| city = Rochester, Minnesota
| branding = KTTC (general)KTTC News (newscasts)Rochester CW (on DT2)| digital = 10 (VHF)
| virtual = 10
| subchannels = 
| translators = K29OE-D 29 (UHF, Racine)K30RA-D 30 (UHF, Racine)K30QY-D (UHF, Oakland)
| affiliations = 10.1: NBC10.2: CW+10.3: Heroes & Icons10.4: Court TV10.5: True Crime Network10.6: Circle
| founded = 
| airdate = 
| location = Rochester/Austin/Albert Lea, Minnesota/Mason City, Iowa
| country = United States
| callsign_meaning = Total Tri-State Coverage
| former_callsigns = KROC-TV (1953–1976)
| former_channel_numbers = Analog:10 (VHF, 1953–2009)Digital:36 (UHF, 2000–2009)Translators:34 W34FC-D La Crosse, WI50 W50DR-D La Crosse, WI62 K62EV Winona, MN67 W67CH La Crosse, WI70 K70DR Blue Earth, MN
| owner = Gray Television
| licensee = Gray Television Licensee, LLC
| sister_stations = KXLT-TV, KXSH-LD
| former_affiliations = All secondary:CBS (July−August 1953)ABC (July 1953–1954)DuMont (July 1953–1955)
| erp = 43.1 kW
| haat = 
| class = DT
| facility_id = 35678
| coordinates = 
| licensing_authority = FCC
| website = 
}}
KTTC (channel 10) is a television station licensed to Rochester, Minnesota, United States, serving Southeast Minnesota and Northern Iowa as an affiliate of NBC and The CW Plus. It is owned by Gray Television, which provides certain services to Fox affiliate KXLT-TV (channel 47) and Telemundo affiliate KXSH-LD (channel 35) under a shared services agreement (SSA) with SagamoreHill Broadcasting. The stations share studios in Rochester on Bandel Road Northwest along US 52, and also maintain an advertising sales office on Lakeview Drive in Clear Lake, Iowa, that serves Mason City. KTTC's transmitter is located south of Ostrander, Minnesota, near the Fillmore–Mower county line.

History
The station launched on July 14, 1953, under the call sign KROC-TV, making it the first station in Southern Minnesota and third in the state after KSTP-TV and WTCN-TV in the Twin Cities. It was owned by the Gentling family and their Southern Minnesota Broadcasting Company, and was a sister to KROC radio (AM 1340 and FM 106.9). The station carried programming from all four commercial networks of the 1950s: ABC, CBS, and DuMont but was a primary NBC affiliate. The station was launched by G. David Gentling, son of family patriarch Gregory P. Gentling. In November 1966, the station moved to a new building on First Avenue Southwest in Downtown Rochester.

In 1976, due to Federal Communications Commission (FCC) restrictions on ownership of multiple stations in a single market, the station was purchased by Quincy Newspapers from Southern Minnesota Broadcasting. The Gentlings would hold onto the radio stations until 2003. In accordance with an FCC regulation in place then that prohibited TV and radio stations in the same market, but with different ownership groups from sharing the same callsign, channel 10's callsign became KTTC on July 1. KTTC-DT began broadcasting on UHF channel 36 in September 2000. The station has been digital-only since February 17, 2009. The station's pre-transition digital facility on channel 36 became the final post-transition facility for ABC affiliate KAAL.

In 2001, Quincy bought Shockley Communications (then owner of KXLT). However, Quincy could not buy KXLT due to FCC rules governing duopolies. The FCC does not allow two of the four highest-rated stations to be owned by one company. Additionally, Rochester–Austin–Mason City has only six full-power stations, not enough to legally permit a duopoly in any case. Nevertheless, Quincy took over KXLT's operations under a shared services agreement. In 2002, KTTC relocated from its longtime studios on First Avenue Southwest in Downtown Rochester to its current location on Bandel Road in North Rochester, the then-current offices for KXLT. Shockley would later sell the Fox station to SagamoreHill Broadcasting in 2005 which continued the operational agreement with Quincy.

In November 2011, the former KTTC studio on First Avenue SW was demolished to clear the way for the University of Minnesota Rochester's future campus. The City of Rochester sold that property and the Fourth Street Boxing Gym and a small halal market were included in the deal. They were also demolished.

On February 1, 2021, Gray Television announced it had purchased Quincy Media for $925 million. The deal is expected to be completed later in 2021. If the deal is approved by the FCC, KTTC will gain additional sister stations in nearby markets, including CBS/Fox affiliate KEYC-TV in Mankato, ABC affiliate KCRG-TV in Cedar Rapids and fellow NBC affiliates KWQC-TV in Davenport and WEAU in Eau Claire, while separating itself from KWWL, WXOW and WQOW which will all have to be divested to complete the purchase. The acquisition was completed on August 2, 2021.

KTTC-DT2

KTTC-DT2 is the CW+-affiliated second digital subchannel of KTTC, broadcasting in 720p high definition on channel 10.2.

History
What is now KTTC-DT2 began on September 21, 1998 after KTTC entered into a partnership with The WB 100+, a national programming service operated by The WB for television markets ranked greater than 100, and cable systems in the Rochester area. Prior to 1998, The WB's programming was available in Rochester via WGN-TV's national feed or local WB affiliate KMWB (now WUCW) in Minneapolis–Saint Paul. It was a cable-exclusive station, and as a result, used the call sign "KWBR" (standing for "The WB Rochester") in a fictional manner for identification purposes. KTTC provided local advertisement opportunities and performed promotional duties for the outlet.

On January 24, 2006, CBS Corporation (which became separate from Viacom after 2005) and Warner Bros. Television (the company which owned The WB) announced they then would cease operating the UPN and WB networks and combine their resources to create a programming service entitled The CW. The letters would represent the first initial of the new network's respective corporate parents.

On September 18 of that year, The CW officially launched nationwide at which point KTTC added a new second digital subchannel to simulcast "KWBR" and allowing non-cable subscribers access to the new network. With its over-their-air launch, "KWBR" began using KTTC-DT2 as its official calls and became part of The CW Plus, a successor to The WB 100+.

Programming

Syndicated programming
Syndicated programming on KTTC includes Inside Edition, Judge Judy and The Drew Barrymore Show, among others.

News operation

In addition to its main studios, KTTC operates an Austin Bureau, within the Riverland Community College campus, on 8th Avenue Northwest.

As of December 2021, KTTC presently broadcasts 27 hours of locally produced newscasts each week (with five hours each weekday, and an hour each on Saturdays and Sundays).

Through a news share agreement in place since 2001, KTTC produces a half-hour prime time newscast on KXLT seen Sunday through Thursday nights. Known as Fox 47 News at Nine, the program originates from a secondary set at the Bandel Road Northwest studios. It features a unique graphics package and news music theme that is different from KTTC. KXLT uses most of this NBC outlet's on-air personnel but maintains separate news anchors who can report for KTTC. At some point in 2009, KIMT added the market's second prime time local news show at 9 to its MyNetworkTV-affiliated second digital subchannel. This newscast could be seen for a half hour competing with KXLT's broadcast. Eventually, the effort would be reduced to a five-minute weather cut-in featuring an updated forecast.

On June 12, 2009, KIMT became the market's first television station to upgrade local newscast production to 16:9 enhanced definition widescreen (with some portions in full high definition). Although not truly HD, the aspect ratio matched that of high definition television screens. Video reports from the field were still seen in pillarboxed 4:3 standard definition. It would not be until March 20, 2011, when KTTC performed an upgrade to full high definition newscasts. With the launch to HD came a brand new set and high definition graphics.

On July 28, 2014, KXLT debuted a weekday morning show known as Fox in the Morning (that is produced by KTTC). Airing for thirty minutes at 8 a.m., the program is formatted like a magazine with lifestyle, cooking, and style segments although there are local weather updates featured in the show. Eventually, this broadcast may be extended into the 7 o'clock hour to offer a true local alternative to the national morning programs seen on the big three affiliates. Like the prime time news at 9, the morning program on KXLT maintains separate anchors from KTTC (except for weather segments) and its own graphics scheme.

Technical information

Subchannels
The station's digital signal is multiplexed:

KTTC offered Minnesota's first full-power digital signal in 2000.

Former translators
In the La Crosse area, KTTC's analog translator W67CH channel 67 ceased broadcasting on November 4, 2009. It was replaced with digital translator station W50DR-D which went on-the-air at 2:10 in the afternoon on October 14. W50DR-D was subsequently replaced with W34FC-D in August 2018. The translator carried subchannels 10.1 NBC and 10.3 Heroes & Icons, as the other subchannels were duplicated on then-sister station and La Crosse affiliate WXOW 19. Until the launch of the La Crosse Digital Replacement Translator (DRT) of WEAU Eau Claire in the summer of 2020, KTTC's La Crosse translator was the only way many area residents could receive NBC over-the-air (due to the area's topography). For nearly a year, W34FC-D and WEAU-DRT La Crosse operated simultaneously, offering area viewers two NBC affiliates. This came to an end on August 2, 2021, when W34FC-D was converted to a translator of WECX-LD, a subsidiary WEAU.

KTTC's other two analog translators, in Winona (K62EV channel 62) and Blue Earth (K70DR channel 70), both left the air on December 29, 2011, due to the end of broadcasting on channels above 51 (K70DR in particular was one of the few remaining stations still operating on channel 70, which was phased out starting in 1983).

References

KTTC History. 
G. David Gentling.  Pavek Museum of Broadcasting Hall of Fame.

External links

KTTC-DT2 "Rochester CW+"
KXLT-TV "Fox 47"

Television channels and stations established in 1953
1953 establishments in Minnesota
TTC
NBC network affiliates
Gray Television
Heroes & Icons affiliates
Court TV affiliates
True Crime Network affiliates